"Way Out" is the debut single by The La's, released on 2 November 1987 after signing to Go! Discs Records.

Music video
The music video was made with a budget of 50 pounds. It was shot on a Super 8 Camera, with the production taking only half a day. The clip depicts the band playing inside a white room as well as a fair and the underground level of Liverpool Lime Street railway station.

Formats and track listings
All songs written by Lee Mavers.

7" single (GOLAS 1)
 "Way Out" – 2:41
 "Endless" – 3:08

12" single (GOLAS 112)
 "Way Out" – 2:41
 "Knock Me Down" – 3:15
 "Endless" – 3:08

12" EP (GOLAS 112)
 "Way Out" – 2:41
 "Knock Me Down" – 3:15
 "Endless" – 3:08
 "Liberty Ship" (4-track demo) – 1:55
 "Freedom Song" (4-track demo) – 2:30

Personnel
The La's
 Lee Mavers – lead vocals and backing vocals, acoustic guitar
 John Power – bass and backing vocals
 Paul Hemmings – electric guitar
 John "Timmo" Timson – drums, tambourine and bells

Production
 Gavin MacKillop – producer, engineer

Other personnel
 David Storey – design

Chart performance

References

External links
Official music video

1987 debut singles
The La's songs
Go! Discs singles
Songs written by Lee Mavers
1987 songs